John Locke  (29 August 1632 – 28 October 1704) was an English philosopher and physician, widely regarded as one of the most influential of Enlightenment thinkers and commonly known as the "father of liberalism". Considered one of the first of the British empiricists, following the tradition of Francis Bacon, Locke is equally important to social contract theory. His work greatly affected the development of epistemology and political philosophy. His writings influenced Voltaire and Jean-Jacques Rousseau, and many Scottish Enlightenment thinkers, as well as the American Revolutionaries. His contributions to classical republicanism and liberal theory are reflected in the United States Declaration of Independence. Internationally, Locke’s political-legal principles continue to have a profound influence on the theory and practice of limited representative government and the protection of basic rights and freedoms under the rule of law.

Locke's theory of mind is often cited as the origin of modern conceptions of identity and the self, figuring prominently in the work of later philosophers such as Jean-Jacques Rousseau, David Hume, and Immanuel Kant. Locke was the first to define the self through a continuity of consciousness. 

He postulated that, at birth, the mind was a blank slate, or tabula rasa. Contrary to Cartesian philosophy based on pre-existing concepts, he maintained that we are born without innate ideas, and that knowledge is instead determined only by experience derived from sense perception, a concept now known as empiricism.

Early life
Locke was born on 29 August 1632, in a small thatched cottage by the church in Wrington, Somerset, about 12 miles from Bristol. He was baptised the same day, as both of his parents were Puritans. Locke's father, also called John, was an attorney who served as clerk to the Justices of the Peace in Chew Magna and as a captain of cavalry for the Parliamentarian forces during the early part of the English Civil War. His mother was Agnes Keene. Soon after Locke's birth, the family moved to the market town of Pensford, about seven miles south of Bristol, where Locke grew up in a rural Tudor house in Belluton.

In 1647, Locke was sent to the prestigious Westminster School in London under the sponsorship of Alexander Popham, a member of Parliament and John Sr.'s former commander. At the age of 16 he was at school just half a mile away from the execution of Charles I; however, the boys were not allowed to go and watch. After completing studies at Westminster, he was admitted to Christ Church, Oxford, in the autumn of 1652 at the age of 20. The dean of the college at the time was John Owen, vice-chancellor of the university. Although a capable student, Locke was irritated by the undergraduate curriculum of the time. He found the works of modern philosophers, such as René Descartes, more interesting than the classical material taught at the university. Through his friend Richard Lower, whom he knew from the Westminster School, Locke was introduced to medicine and the experimental philosophy being pursued at other universities and in the Royal Society, of which he eventually became a member.

Locke was awarded a bachelor's degree in February 1656 and a master's degree in June 1658. He obtained a bachelor of medicine in February 1675, having studied the subject extensively during his time at Oxford and, in addition to Lower, worked with such noted scientists and thinkers as Robert Boyle, Thomas Willis and Robert Hooke. In 1666, he met Anthony Ashley Cooper, Lord Ashley, who had come to Oxford seeking treatment for a liver infection. Ashley was impressed with Locke and persuaded him to become part of his retinue.

Career

Work 
Locke had been looking for a career and in 1667 moved into Ashley's home at Exeter House in London, to serve as his personal physician. In London, Locke resumed his medical studies under the tutelage of Thomas Sydenham. Sydenham had a major effect on Locke's natural philosophical thinkingan effect that would become evident in An Essay Concerning Human Understanding.

Locke's medical knowledge was put to the test when Ashley's liver infection became life-threatening. Locke coordinated the advice of several physicians and was probably instrumental in persuading Ashley to undergo surgery (then life-threatening in itself) to remove the cyst. Ashley survived and prospered, crediting Locke with saving his life.

During this time, Locke served as Secretary of the Board of Trade and Plantations and Secretary to the Lords Proprietors of Carolina, which helped to shape his ideas on international trade and economics.

Ashley, as a founder of the Whig movement, exerted great influence on Locke's political ideas. Locke became involved in politics when Ashley became Lord Chancellor in 1672 (Ashley being created 1st Earl of Shaftesbury in 1673). Following Shaftesbury's fall from favour in 1675, Locke spent some time travelling across France as a tutor and medical attendant to Caleb Banks. He returned to England in 1679 when Shaftesbury's political fortunes took a brief positive turn. Around this time, most likely at Shaftesbury's prompting, Locke composed the bulk of the Two Treatises of Government. While it was once thought that Locke wrote the Treatises to defend the Glorious Revolution of 1688, recent scholarship has shown that the work was composed well before this date. The work is now viewed as a more general argument against absolute monarchy (particularly as espoused by Robert Filmer and Thomas Hobbes) and for individual consent as the basis of political legitimacy. Although Locke was associated with the influential Whigs, his ideas about natural rights and government are today considered quite revolutionary for that period in English history.

The Netherlands 
Locke fled to the Netherlands in 1683, under strong suspicion of involvement in the Rye House Plot, although there is little evidence to suggest that he was directly involved in the scheme. The philosopher and novelist Rebecca Newberger Goldstein argues that during his five years in Holland, Locke chose his friends "from among the same freethinking members of dissenting Protestant groups as Spinoza's small group of loyal confidants. [Baruch Spinoza had died in 1677.] Locke almost certainly met men in Amsterdam who spoke of the ideas of that renegade Jew who... insisted on identifying himself through his religion of reason alone." While she says that "Locke's strong empiricist tendencies" would have "disinclined him to read a grandly metaphysical work such as Spinoza's Ethics, in other ways he was deeply receptive to Spinoza's ideas, most particularly to the rationalist's well thought out argument for political and religious tolerance and the necessity of the separation of church and state." In the Netherlands, Locke had time to return to his writing, spending a great deal of time working on the Essay Concerning Human Understanding and composing the Letter on Toleration.

Return to England 
Locke did not return home until after the Glorious Revolution. Locke accompanied Mary II back to England in 1689. The bulk of Locke's publishing took place upon his return from exilehis aforementioned Essay Concerning Human Understanding, the Two Treatises of Government and A Letter Concerning Toleration all appearing in quick succession.

Locke's close friend Lady Masham invited him to join her at Otes, the Mashams' country house in Essex. Although his time there was marked by variable health from asthma attacks, he nevertheless became an intellectual hero of the Whigs. During this period he discussed matters with such figures as John Dryden and Isaac Newton.

Death 
He died on 28 October 1704, and is buried in the churchyard of the village of High Laver, east of Harlow in Essex, where he had lived in the household of Sir Francis Masham since 1691. Locke never married nor had children.

Events that happened during Locke's lifetime include the English Restoration, the Great Plague of London, the Great Fire of London, and the Glorious Revolution. He did not quite see the Act of Union of 1707, though the thrones of England and Scotland were held in personal union throughout his lifetime. Constitutional monarchy and parliamentary democracy were in their infancy during Locke's time.

Philosophy 

In the late 17th and early 18th centuries, Locke's Two Treatises were rarely cited. Historian Julian Hoppit said of the book, "except among some Whigs, even as a contribution to the intense debate of the 1690s it made little impression and was generally ignored until 1703 (though in Oxford in 1695 it was reported to have made 'a great noise')." John Kenyon, in his study of British political debate from 1689 to 1720, has remarked that Locke's theories were "mentioned so rarely in the early stages of the [Glorious] Revolution, up to 1692, and even less thereafter, unless it was to heap abuse on them" and that "no one, including most Whigs, [was] ready for the idea of a notional or abstract contract of the kind adumbrated by Locke". In contrast, Kenyon adds that Algernon Sidney's Discourses Concerning Government were "certainly much more influential than Locke's Two Treatises."

In the 50 years after Queen Anne's death in 1714, the Two Treatises were reprinted only once (except in the collected works of Locke). However, with the rise of American resistance to British taxation, the Second Treatise of Government gained a new readership; it was frequently cited in the debates in both America and Britain. The first American printing occurred in 1773 in Boston.

Locke exercised a profound influence on political philosophy, in particular on modern liberalism. Michael Zuckert has argued that Locke launched liberalism by tempering Hobbesian absolutism and clearly separating the realms of Church and State. He had a strong influence on Voltaire, who called him "le sage Locke". His arguments concerning liberty and the social contract later influenced the written works of Alexander Hamilton, James Madison, Thomas Jefferson, and other Founding Fathers of the United States. In fact, one passage from the Second Treatise is reproduced verbatim in the Declaration of Independence, the reference to a "long train of abuses". Such was Locke's influence that Thomas Jefferson wrote:Bacon, Locke and Newton… I consider them as the three greatest men that have ever lived, without any exception, and as having laid the foundation of those superstructures which have been raised in the Physical and Moral sciences.However, Locke's influence may have been even more profound in the realm of epistemology. Locke redefined subjectivity, or self, leading intellectual historians such as Charles Taylor and Jerrold Seigel to argue that Locke's An Essay Concerning Human Understanding (1689/90) marks the beginning of the modern Western conception of the self.

Locke's theory of association heavily influenced the subject matter of modern psychology. At the time, Locke's recognition of two types of ideas, simple and complexand, more importantly, their interaction through associationinspired other philosophers, such as David Hume and George Berkeley, to revise and expand this theory and apply it to explain how humans gain knowledge in the physical world.

Religious tolerance

Writing his Letters Concerning Toleration (1689–1692) in the aftermath of the European wars of religion, Locke formulated a classic reasoning for religious tolerance, in which three arguments are central:

 earthly judges, the state in particular, and human beings generally, cannot dependably evaluate the truth-claims of competing religious standpoints;
 even if they could, enforcing a single 'true religion' would not have the desired effect, because belief cannot be compelled by violence;
 coercing religious uniformity would lead to more social disorder than allowing diversity.

With regard to his position on religious tolerance, Locke was influenced by Baptist theologians like John Smyth and Thomas Helwys, who had published tracts demanding freedom of conscience in the early 17th century. Baptist theologian Roger Williams founded the colony of Rhode Island in 1636, where he combined a democratic constitution with unlimited religious freedom. His tract, The Bloudy Tenent of Persecution for Cause of Conscience (1644), which was widely read in the mother country, was a passionate plea for absolute religious freedom and the total separation of church and state. Freedom of conscience had had high priority on the theological, philosophical, and political agenda, as Martin Luther refused to recant his beliefs before the Diet of the Holy Roman Empire at Worms in 1521, unless he would be proved false by the Bible.

Slavery and child labour 
Locke's views on slavery were multifaceted and complex. Although he wrote against slavery in general, Locke was an investor and beneficiary of the slave trading Royal Africa Company. In addition, while secretary to the Earl of Shaftesbury, Locke participated in drafting the Fundamental Constitutions of Carolina, which established a quasi-feudal aristocracy and gave Carolinian planters absolute power over their enslaved chattel property; the constitutions pledged that "every freeman of Carolina shall have absolute power and authority over his negro slaves". Philosopher Martin Cohen notes that Locke, as secretary to the Council of Trade and Plantations and a member of the Board of Trade, was "one of just half a dozen men who created and supervised both the colonies and their iniquitous systems of servitude". 
According to American historian James Farr, Locke never expressed any thoughts concerning his contradictory opinions regarding slavery, which Farr ascribes to his personal involvement in the slave trade. Locke's positions on slavery have been described as hypocritical, and laying the foundation for the Founding Fathers to hold similarly contradictory thoughts regarding freedom and slavery.

Historian Holly Brewer has argued, however, that Locke's role in the Constitution of Carolina has been exaggerated and that he was merely paid to revise and make copies of a document that had already been partially written before he became involved; she compares Locke's role to a lawyer writing a will. She further says that Locke was paid in Royal African Company stock in lieu of money for his work as a secretary for a governmental sub-committee and that he sold the stock after a few years. Brewer likewise argues that Locke actively worked to undermine slavery in Virginia while heading a Board of Trade created by William of Orange following the Glorious Revolution. He specifically attacked colonial policy granting land to slave owners and encouraged the baptism and Christian education of the children of enslaved Africans to undercut a major justification of slaverythat they were heathens that possessed no rights.

Locke also supported child labour. In his "Essay on the Poor Law", he turns to the education of the poor; he laments that "the children of labouring people are an ordinary burden to the parish, and are usually maintained in idleness, so that their labour also is generally lost to the public till they are 12 or 14 years old". He suggests, therefore, that "working schools" be set up in each parish in England for poor children so that they will be "from infancy [three years old] inured to work". He goes on to outline the economics of these schools, arguing not only that they will be profitable for the parish, but also that they will instill a good work ethic in the children.

Government

Locke's political theory was founded upon that of social contract. Unlike Thomas Hobbes, Locke believed that human nature is characterised by reason and tolerance. Like Hobbes, however, Locke believed that human nature allows people to be selfish. This is apparent with the introduction of currency. In a natural state, all people were equal and independent, and everyone had a natural right to defend his "life, health, liberty, or possessions". Most scholars trace the phrase "Life, Liberty and the pursuit of Happiness" in the American Declaration of Independence to Locke's theory of rights, although other origins have been suggested.

Like Hobbes, Locke assumed that the sole right to defend in the state of nature was not enough, so people established a civil society to resolve conflicts in a civil way with help from government in a state of society. However, Locke never refers to Hobbes by name and may instead have been responding to other writers of the day. Locke also advocated governmental separation of powers and believed that revolution is not only a right but an obligation in some circumstances. These ideas would come to have profound influence on the Declaration of Independence and the Constitution of the United States.

Accumulation of wealth 

According to Locke, unused property is wasteful and an offence against nature, but, with the introduction of "durable" goods, men could exchange their excessive perishable goods for those which would last longer and thus not offend the natural law. In his view, the introduction of money marked the culmination of this process, making possible the unlimited accumulation of property without causing waste through spoilage. He also includes gold or silver as money because they may be "hoarded up without injury to anyone", as they do not spoil or decay in the hands of the possessor. In his view, the introduction of money eliminates limits to accumulation. Locke stresses that inequality has come about by tacit agreement on the use of money, not by the social contract establishing civil society or the law of land regulating property. Locke is aware of a problem posed by unlimited accumulation, but does not consider it his task. He just implies that government would function to moderate the conflict between the unlimited accumulation of property and a more nearly equal distribution of wealth; he does not identify which principles that government should apply to solve this problem. However, not all elements of his thought form a consistent whole. For example, the labour theory of value in the Two Treatises of Government stands side by side with the demand-and-supply theory of value developed in a letter he wrote titled Some Considerations on the Consequences of the Lowering of Interest and the Raising of the Value of Money. Moreover, Locke anchors property in labour but, in the end, upholds unlimited accumulation of wealth.

Ideas

Economics

On price theory
Locke's general theory of value and price is a supply-and-demand theory, set out in a letter to a member of parliament in 1691, titled Some Considerations on the Consequences of the Lowering of Interest and the Raising of the Value of Money. In it, he refers to supply as quantity and demand as rent: "The price of any commodity rises or falls by the proportion of the number of buyers and sellers" and "that which regulates the price…[of goods] is nothing else but their quantity in proportion to their rent."

The quantity theory of money forms a special case of this general theory. His idea is based on "money answers all things" (Ecclesiastes) or "rent of money is always sufficient, or more than enough" and "varies very little". Locke concludes that, as far as money is concerned, the demand for it is exclusively regulated by its quantity, regardless of whether the demand is unlimited or constant. He also investigates the determinants of demand and supply. For supply, he explains the value of goods as based on their scarcity and ability to be exchanged and consumed. He explains demand for goods as based on their ability to yield a flow of income. Locke develops an early theory of capitalisation, such as of land, which has value because "by its constant production of saleable commodities it brings in a certain yearly income". He considers the demand for money as almost the same as demand for goods or land: it depends on whether money is wanted as medium of exchange. As a medium of exchange, he states, "money is capable by exchange to procure us the necessaries or conveniences of life" and, for loanable funds, "it comes to be of the same nature with land by yielding a certain yearly income…or interest".

Monetary thoughts
Locke distinguishes two functions of money: as a counter to measure value, and as a pledge to lay claim to goods. He believes that silver and gold, as opposed to paper money, are the appropriate currency for international transactions. Silver and gold, he says, are treated to have equal value by all of humanity and can thus be treated as a pledge by anyone, while the value of paper money is only valid under the government which issues it.

Locke argues that a country should seek a favourable balance of trade, lest it fall behind other countries and suffer a loss in its trade. Since the world money stock grows constantly, a country must constantly seek to enlarge its own stock. Locke develops his theory of foreign exchanges, in addition to commodity movements, there are also movements in country stock of money, and movements of capital determine exchange rates. He considers the latter less significant and less volatile than commodity movements. As for a country's money stock, if it is large relative to that of other countries, he says it will cause the country's exchange to rise above par, as an export balance would do.

He also prepares estimates of the cash requirements for different economic groups (landholders, labourers, and brokers). In each group he posits that the cash requirements are closely related to the length of the pay period. He argues the brokers—the middlemen—whose activities enlarge the monetary circuit and whose profits eat into the earnings of labourers and landholders, have a negative influence on both personal and the public economy to which they supposedly contribute.

Theory of value and property
Locke uses the concept of property in both broad and narrow terms: broadly, it covers a wide range of human interests and aspirations; more particularly, it refers to material goods. He argues that property is a natural right that is derived from labour. In Chapter V of his Second Treatise, Locke argues that the individual ownership of goods and property is justified by the labour exerted to produce such goods"at least where there is enough [land], and as good, left in common for others" (para. 27)or to use property to produce goods beneficial to human society.

Locke states in his Second Treatise that nature on its own provides little of value to society, implying that the labour expended in the creation of goods gives them their value. From this premise, understood as a labour theory of value, Locke developed a labour theory of property, whereby ownership of property is created by the application of labour. In addition, he believed that property precedes government and government cannot "dispose of the estates of the subjects arbitrarily". Karl Marx later critiqued Locke's theory of property in his own social theory.

The human mind

The self
Locke defines the self as "that conscious thinking thing, (whatever substance, made up of whether spiritual, or material, simple, or compounded, it matters not) which is sensible, or conscious of pleasure and pain, capable of happiness or misery, and so is concerned for itself, as far as that consciousness extends". He does not, however, wholly ignore "substance", writing that "the body too goes to the making the man".

In his Essay, Locke explains the gradual unfolding of this conscious mind. Arguing against both the Augustinian view of man as originally sinful and the Cartesian position, which holds that man innately knows basic logical propositions, Locke posits an 'empty mind', a tabula rasa, which is shaped by experience; sensations and reflections being the two sources of all of our ideas. He states in An Essay Concerning Human Understanding:

This source of ideas every man has wholly within himself; and though it be not sense, as having nothing to do with external objects, yet it is very like it, and might properly enough be called 'internal sense.'

Locke's Some Thoughts Concerning Education is an outline on how to educate this mind. Drawing on thoughts expressed in letters written to Mary Clarke and her husband about their son, he expresses the belief that education makes the manor, more fundamentally, that the mind is an "empty cabinet":I think I may say that of all the men we meet with, nine parts of ten are what they are, good or evil, useful or not, by their education.Locke also wrote that "the little and almost insensible impressions on our tender infancies have very important and lasting consequences". He argues that the "associations of ideas" that one makes when young are more important than those made later because they are the foundation of the self; they are, put differently, what first mark the tabula rasa. In his Essay, in which both these concepts are introduced, Locke warns, for example, against letting "a foolish maid" convince a child that "goblins and sprites" are associated with the night, for "darkness shall ever afterwards bring with it those frightful ideas, and they shall be so joined, that he can no more bear the one than the other".

This theory came to be called associationism, going on to strongly influence 18th-century thought, particularly educational theory, as nearly every educational writer warned parents not to allow their children to develop negative associations. It also led to the development of psychology and other new disciplines with David Hartley's attempt to discover a biological mechanism for associationism in his Observations on Man (1749).

Dream argument
Locke was critical of Descartes's version of the dream argument, with Locke making the counter-argument that people cannot have physical pain in dreams as they do in waking life.

Religion

Religious beliefs
Some scholars have seen Locke's political convictions as being based from his religious beliefs. Locke's religious trajectory began in Calvinist trinitarianism, but by the time of the Reflections (1695) Locke was advocating not just Socinian views on tolerance but also Socinian Christology. However Wainwright (1987) notes that in the posthumously published Paraphrase (1707) Locke's interpretation of one verse, Ephesians 1:10, is markedly different from that of Socinians like Biddle, and may indicate that near the end of his life Locke returned nearer to an Arian position, thereby accepting Christ's pre-existence.
Locke was at times not sure about the subject of original sin, so he was accused of Socinianism, Arianism, or Deism. Locke argued that the idea that "all Adam'''s Posterity [are] doomed to Eternal Infinite Punishment, for the Transgression of Adam" was "little consistent with the Justice or Goodness of the Great and Infinite God", leading Eric Nelson to associate him with Pelagian ideas. However, he did not deny the reality of evil. Man was capable of waging unjust wars and committing crimes. Criminals had to be punished, even with the death penalty.

With regard to the Bible, Locke was very conservative. He retained the doctrine of the verbal inspiration of the Scriptures. The miracles were proof of the divine nature of the biblical message. Locke was convinced that the entire content of the Bible was in agreement with human reason (The Reasonableness of Christianity, 1695). Although Locke was an advocate of tolerance, he urged the authorities not to tolerate atheism, because he thought the denial of God's existence would undermine the social order and lead to chaos. That excluded all atheistic varieties of philosophy and all attempts to deduce ethics and natural law from purely secular premises. In Locke's opinion the cosmological argument was valid and proved God's existence. His political thought was based on Protestant Christian views. Additionally, Locke advocated a sense of piety out of gratitude to God for giving reason to men.

 Philosophy from religion 
Locke's concept of man started with the belief in creation. Like philosophers Hugo Grotius and Samuel Pufendorf, Locke equated natural law with the biblical revelation., 5(3):721. Locke derived the fundamental concepts of his political theory from biblical texts, in particular from Genesis 1 and 2 (creation), the Decalogue, the Golden Rule, the teachings of Jesus, and the letters of Paul the Apostle. The Decalogue puts a person's life, reputation and property under God's protection.

Locke's philosophy on freedom is also derived from the Bible. Locke derived from the Bible basic human equality (including equality of the sexes), the starting point of the theological doctrine of Imago Dei. To Locke, one of the consequences of the principle of equality was that all humans were created equally free and therefore governments needed the consent of the governed. Locke compared the English monarchy's rule over the British people to Adam's rule over Eve in Genesis, which was appointed by God.

Following Locke's philosophy, the American Declaration of Independence founded human rights partially on the biblical belief in creation. Locke's doctrine that governments need the consent of the governed is also central to the Declaration of Independence.

 Library
 Manuscripts, books and treatises 

Locke was an assiduous book collector and notetaker throughout his life. By his death in 1704, Locke had amassed a library of more than 3,000 books, a significant number in the seventeenth century. Unlike some of his contemporaries, Locke took care to catalogue and preserve his library, and his will made specific provisions for how his library was to be distributed after his death. Locke's will offered Lady Masham the choice of "any four folios, eight quartos and twenty books of less volume, which she shall choose out of the books in my Library." Locke also gave six titles to his “good friend” Anthony Collins, but Locke bequeathed the majority of his collection to his cousin Peter King (later Lord King) and to Lady Masham's son, Francis Cudworth Masham.

Francis Masham was promised one “moiety” (half) of Locke's library when he reached “the age of one and twenty years.” The other “moiety” of Locke's books, along with his manuscripts, passed to his cousin King. Over the next two centuries, the Masham portion of Locke's library was dispersed. The manuscripts and books left to King, however, remained with King's descendants (later the Earls of Lovelace), until most of the collection was bought by the Bodleian Library, Oxford in 1947. Another portion of the books Locke left to King was discovered by the collector and philanthropist Paul Mellon in 1951. Mellon supplemented this discovery with books from Locke's library which he bought privately, and in 1978, he transferred his collection to the Bodleian. The holdings in the Locke Room at the Bodleian have been a valuable resource for scholars interested in Locke, his philosophy, practices for information management, and the history of the book.

Many of the books still contain Locke's signature, which he often made on the pastedowns of his books. Many also include Locke's marginalia.

The printed books in Locke's library reflected his various intellectual interests as well as his movements at different stages of his life. Locke travelled extensively in France and the Netherlands during the 1670s and 1680s, and during this time he acquired many books from the continent. Only half of the books in Locke's library were printed in England, while close to 40% came from France and the Netherlands. These books cover a wide range of subjects. According to John Harrison and Peter Laslett, the largest genres in Locke's library were theology (23.8% of books), medicine (11.1%), politics and law (10.7%), and classical literature (10.1%). The Bodleian library currently holds more than 800 of the books from Locke's library. These include Locke's copies of works by several of the most influential figures of the seventeenth century, including

 The Quaker William Penn: An address to Protestants of all perswasions (Bodleian Locke 7.69a)
 The explorer Francis Drake: The world encompassed by Sir Francis Drake (Bodleian Locke 8.37c)
 The scientist Robert Boyle: A discourse of things above reason (Bodleian Locke 7.272)
 The bishop and historian Thomas Sprat: The history of the Royal-Society of London (Bodleian Locke 9.10a)

In addition to books owned by Locke, the Bodleian also possesses more than 100 manuscripts related to Locke or written in his hand. Like the books in Locke's library, these manuscripts display a range of interests and provide different windows into Locke's activity and relationships. Several of the manuscripts include letters to and from acquaintances like Peter King (MS Locke b. 6) and Nicolas Toinard (MS Locke c. 45). MS Locke f. 1–10 contain Locke's journals for most years between 1675 and 1704. Some of the most significant manuscripts include early drafts of Locke's writings, such as his Essay concerning human understanding (MS Locke f. 26). The Bodleian also holds a copy of Robert Boyle's General History of the Air with corrections and notes Locke made while preparing Boyle's work for posthumous publication (MS Locke c. 37 ). Other manuscripts contain unpublished works. Among others, MS. Locke e. 18 includes some of Locke's thoughts on the Glorious Revolution, which Locke sent to his friend Edward Clarke but never published.

One of the largest categories of manuscript at the Bodleian comprises Locke's notebooks and commonplace books. The scholar Richard Yeo calls Locke a "Master Note-taker" and explains that "Locke's methodical note-taking pervaded most areas of his life." In an unpublished essay “Of Study,” Locke argued that a notebook should work like a “chest-of-drawers” for organizing information, which would be a "great help to the memory and means to avoid confusion in our thoughts." Locke kept several notebooks and commonplace books, which he organized according to topic. MS Locke c. 43 includes Locke's notes on theology, while MS Locke f. 18–24 contain medical notes. Other notebooks, such as MS c. 43, incorporate several topics in the same notebook, but separated into sections.

These commonplace books were highly personal and were designed to be used by Locke himself rather than accessible to a wide audience. Locke's notes are often abbreviated and are full of codes which he used to reference material across notebooks. Another way Locke personalized his notebooks was by devising his own method of creating indexes using a grid system and Latin keywords. Instead of recording entire words, his indexes shortened words to their first letter and vowel. Thus, the word "Epistle" would be classified as "Ei". Locke published his method in French in 1686, and it was republished posthumously in English in 1706.

Some of the books in Locke's library at the Bodleian are a combination of manuscript and print. Locke had some of his books interleaved, meaning that they were bound with blank sheets in-between the printed pages to enable annotations. Locke interleaved and annotated his five volumes of the New Testament in French, Greek, and Latin (Bodleian Locke 9.103-107). Locke did the same with his copy of Thomas Hyde's Bodleian Library catalogue (Bodleian Locke 16.17), which Locke used to create a catalogue of his own library.

 Writing 
List of major works
 1689. A Letter Concerning Toleration.
 1690. A Second Letter Concerning Toleration 1692. A Third Letter for Toleration 1689/90. Two Treatises of Government (published throughout the 18th century by London bookseller Andrew Millar by commission for Thomas Hollis)
 1689/90. An Essay Concerning Human Understanding 1691. Some Considerations on the consequences of the Lowering of Interest and the Raising of the Value of Money 1693. Some Thoughts Concerning Education 1695. The Reasonableness of Christianity, as Delivered in the Scriptures 1695. A Vindication of the Reasonableness of ChristianityMajor posthumous manuscripts
 1660. First Tract of Government (or the English Tract)
 c.1662. Second Tract of Government (or the Latin Tract)
 1664. Questions Concerning the Law of Nature.
 1667. Essay Concerning Toleration 1706. Of the Conduct of the Understanding 1707. A paraphrase and notes on the Epistles of St. Paul to the Galatians, 1 and 2 Corinthians, Romans, EphesiansSee also

 List of liberal theorists

References
Notes

 Citations 

Sources

 Ashcraft, Richard, 1986.  Revolutionary Politics & Locke's Two Treatises of Government.  Princeton: Princeton University Press. Discusses the relationship between Locke's philosophy and his political activities.
 Ayers, Michael, 1991. Locke. Epistemology & Ontology Routledge (the standard work on Locke's Essay Concerning Human Understanding.)
 Bailyn, Bernard, 1992 (1967). The Ideological Origins of the American Revolution. Harvard Uni. Press. Discusses the influence of Locke and other thinkers upon the American Revolution and on subsequent American political thought.
 
 Cohen, Gerald, 1995. 'Marx and Locke on Land and Labour', in his Self-Ownership, Freedom and Equality, Oxford University Press.
 Cox, Richard, Locke on War and Peace, Oxford: Oxford University Press, 1960. A discussion of Locke's theory of international relations.
 Chappell, Vere, ed., 1994. The Cambridge Companion to Locke. Cambridge U.P. excerpt and text search
 Dunn, John, 1984. Locke. Oxford Uni. Press. A succinct introduction.
 ———, 1969. The Political Thought of John Locke: An Historical Account of the Argument of the "Two Treatises of Government". Cambridge Uni. Press. Introduced the interpretation which emphasises the theological element in Locke's political thought.
 
 Hudson, Nicholas, "John Locke and the Tradition of Nominalism," in: Nominalism and Literary Discourse, ed. Hugo Keiper, Christoph Bode, and Richard Utz (Amsterdam: Rodopi, 1997), pp. 283–99.
  to 
 
 
 Locke Studies, appearing annually from 2001, formerly The Locke Newsletter (1970–2000), publishes scholarly work on John Locke.
 
 Macpherson, C.B. The Political Theory of Possessive Individualism: Hobbes to Locke (Oxford: Oxford University Press, 1962). Establishes the deep affinity from Hobbes to Harrington, the Levellers, and Locke through to nineteenth-century utilitarianism.
 
 
 
 
 
 Tully, James, 1980.  A Discourse on Property : John Locke and his Adversaries. Cambridge Uni. Press
 
 Yolton, John W., ed., 1969. John Locke: Problems and Perspectives. Cambridge Uni. Press.
 Yolton, John W., ed., 1993. A Locke Dictionary. Oxford: Blackwell.
 Zuckert, Michael, Launching Liberalism: On Lockean Political Philosophy. Lawrence: University Press of Kansas.

External links

Works
 
 The Clarendon Edition of the Works of John Locke
 Of the Conduct of the Understanding
 
 
 
 Work by John Locke at Online Books
 The Works of John Locke 1823 Edition, 10 volumes on PDF files, and additional resources
 John Locke Manuscripts
 Updated versions of Essay Concerning Human Understanding, Second Treatise of Government, Letter on Toleration and Conduct of the Understanding, edited (i.e. modernized and abridged) by Jonathan Bennett

Resources
 
 
 
 
 John Locke Bibliography
 Locke Studies An Annual Journal of Locke Research
 .
 .
 .
 , a complex and positive answer.
 
Anstey, Peter, John Locke and Natural Philosophy, Oxford University Press, 2011.''

 
1632 births
1704 deaths
17th-century English male writers
17th-century English medical doctors
17th-century English philosophers
17th-century English writers
Alumni of Christ Church, Oxford
Anglican philosophers
British classical liberals
British expatriates in the Dutch Republic
Critics of atheism
Empiricists
English Anglicans
English Christian theologians
English political philosophers
Enlightenment philosophers
Epistemologists
Fellows of Christ Church, Oxford
Fellows of the Royal Society
Metaphysicians
Ontologists
People educated at Westminster School, London
People from Epping Forest District
People from Wrington
People of the Rye House Plot
Philosophers of identity
Philosophers of language
Philosophers of law
Philosophers of education